The Theater in der Josefstadt is a theater in Vienna in the eighth district of Josefstadt. It was founded in 1788 and is the oldest still performing theater in Vienna. It is often referred to colloquially as simply Die Josefstadt. 

Following remodeling and rebuilding in 1822 — celebrated by the performance of the overture Die Weihe des Hauses ('Consecration of the House') by Beethoven — opera was staged there including Meyerbeer and Wagner. From 1858 onwards the theatre gave up opera and instead concentrated on straight theatre and comedy.

Major figures in musical and theatrical history connected with the house
Ludwig van Beethoven and Richard Wagner conducted there. 
Johann Nestroy and Ferdinand Raimund were connected to the theater as actors and poets.
Johann Strauss I performed in the Sträußelsälen.
In 1814, Ferdinand Raimund had his Vienna debut as Franz Moor in Die Räuber by Friedrich Schiller.
In 1822, Die Weihe des Hauses composed and directed by Ludwig van Beethoven.
In 1829 Johann Nestroy debuted as an actor with the ''Die Verbannung aus dem Zauberreich oder Dreißig Jahre aus dem Leben eines Lumpen.
From 1833 to 1836 Conradin Kreutzer was the theater conductor and on 13 January 1834, his romantic opera Das Nachtlager in Granada was first performed in the theater.
On 20 February 1834, Ferdinand Raimund's Der Verschwender was first performed with the poet in the role of Valentin (with stage music by Kreutzer).
Between around 1840 and 1860, famous dancers Fanny Elssler and the Spanish Pepita de Oliva performed in the theater.
Franz von Suppé wrote music for over a hundred productions at the theater. 
The first German-language performance of Ferenc Molnár's Liliom with Josef Jarno in the title role on 28 February 1913 played a key role in the piece's long-lasting appeal.

Directors (with their years of service)

 1788 – 1812 Karl Felix Mayer
 1812 – 1822 ?
 1822 – 1824 Karl Friedrich Hensler
 1824 – 1828 J. von Scheidlin
 1828 – 1831 Carl Carl
 1831 – 1834 Johann August Stöger
 1834 – 1836 Scheiner
 1837 – 1848 Franz Pokorny
 1848 – 1865 ?
 1865 – 1866 Johann Fürst
 1866 – 1871 ?
 1871 – 1877 Johann Fürst
 1877 – 1899 ?
 1899 – 1923 Josef Jarno
 1924 – 1926 Max Reinhardt
 1926 – 1933 Max Reinhardt and Emil Geyer
 1933 – 1935 Max Reinhardt and Otto Preminger
 1935 – 1938 Max Reinhardt and Ernst Lothar
 1938 – 1938 Robert Valberg
 1938 – 1945 Heinz Hilpert
 1945 – 1953 Rudolf Steinboeck
 1953 – 1958 Franz Stoß and Ernst Haeussermann
 1958 – 1977 Franz Stoß
 1977 – 1984 Ernst Haeussermann
 1984 – 1988 Heinrich Kraus (in September 1986 Boy Gobert was to become director, but died only a few months before)
 1988 – 1997 Otto Schenk and Robert Jungbluth
 1997 – 1999 Helmuth Lohner and Robert Jungbluth
 1999 – 2003 Alexander Götz and Robert Jungbluth
 2003 – 2004 Hans Gratzer
 2004 – 2006 Helmuth Lohner
 2006 –      Herbert Föttinger

Famous ensemble members 

Albert Bassermann
Klaus Maria Brandauer
Attila Hörbiger
Curd Jürgens
Fritz Kortner
Werner Krauß
Wolfgang Liebeneiner
Helmuth Lohner
Karl Merkatz
Fritz Muliar
Johann Nestroy
Susi Nicoletti
Ferdinand Raimund
Otto Schenk
Hans Thimig
Paula Wessely
Bernhard Wicki

External links 
 

Buildings and structures in Josefstadt
Theatres completed in 1788
Theatres completed in 1822
Theatres in Vienna
Cultural venues in Vienna
1788 establishments in Austria